André "Andy" Halter (born 21 April 1966) is a Swiss former footballer who played as a forward and made nine appearances for the Switzerland national team.

Career
Halter made his debut for Switzerland on 9 April 1986 in a friendly match against West Germany, which finished as a 0–1 loss. He went on to make nine appearances, scoring one goal, before making his last appearance on 7 June 1989 in a 1990 FIFA World Cup qualification match against Czechoslovakia, which finished as a 0–1 loss.

Career statistics

International

International goals

References

External links
 
 
 

1966 births
Living people
Sportspeople from Lucerne
Swiss men's footballers
Switzerland international footballers
Association football forwards
FC Luzern players
Grasshopper Club Zürich players
Swiss Super League players